The Bute County Regiment was authorized on September 9, 1775 by the North Carolina Provincial Congress.  It was subordinate to the Halifax District Brigade of militia commanded by Brigadier Allen Jones.  The regiment was not engaged in any battles or skirmishes against the British during the American Revolution between 1775 and when it was disbanded on January 30, 1779.  It was disbanded when Bute county was dissolved and split into Franklin and Warren counties.   The regiment was split into the Franklin County Regiment and Warren County Regiment.

Leadership
The Bute County Regiment was commanded by the following colonels:
 Colonel William Person (September 9, 1775 to April 1776)
 Colonel Philemon Hawkins, Jr. (1776 to 1779), also a Lieutenant Colonel; After the regiment was disestablished, he was assigned as a Lieutenant Colonel in the Warren County Regiment
 Colonel Thomas Eaton (1776-1779); After the regiment was disestablished, he was assigned the command of the Warren County Regiment (1779-1783) and acting commander (Brigadier General Pro Tempore) of the Halifax District Brigade in 1779 and 1781

In February 1776, the regiment was en route to Moore's Creek Bridge but arrived too late to see any action.

Known Majors included:
1st Maj. William Alston
2nd Maj. Thomas Sherrod
Maj. William Brickell
Maj. Green Hill
Maj. Isaac Horn

Known Captains included:

Charles Allen, Sr.
William Allen
Thomas Alston
James Carver
John Cokely
John Colclough
James Denton
James Garrison
Robert Goodloe
William Green
Britton Harris
Jordan Harris
Philemon Hawkins, Jr.
Alsey High
William Hill
John Hopkins
Henry Hunt
Unknown Jeter
Unknown Lynch
Harrison Macon
John McCann
Benjamin Seawell
Robert Temple
Nathan Turner

See also
 Bute County, North Carolina
 Warren County, North Carolina
 Franklin County, North Carolina
 Warren County Regiment
 Southern Campaigns: Pension Transactions for a description of the transcription effort by Will Graves
 Southern theater of the American Revolutionary War
 List of North Carolina militia units in the American Revolution

References

North Carolina militia
Warren County, North Carolina
Franklin County, North Carolina
1775 establishments in North Carolina
Bute County, North Carolina